Jack Nash may refer to:

Jack Nash (English cricketer) (1873–1956), English cricketer
Jack Nash (Australian cricketer) (born 1950), Australian cricketer
Jack Nash (businessman) (1929–2008), American hedge fund pioneer

See also
John Nash (disambiguation)